Kangyi may refer to:

Burma
Kangyi, Banmauk
Kangyi, Bhamo
Kangyi, Kale
Kangyi, Mudon

China
Kangyi, Wenshang County (康驿镇), town in Wenshang County, Shandong

Kangyi,Mudon